Eric Josef Arno Voufack (born 25 September 2001) is a German footballer who plays as a right-back for 1. FC Lokomotive Leipzig.

Career statistics

Club

Notes

References

2001 births
Living people
German footballers
Association football defenders
3. Liga players
Regionalliga players
Hallescher FC players
FC Carl Zeiss Jena players
1. FC Lokomotive Leipzig players